Essambo Ewane (born 5 October 1952) is a Cameroonian judoka. He competed at the 1980 Summer Olympics and the 1984 Summer Olympics.

References

1952 births
Living people
Cameroonian male judoka
Olympic judoka of Cameroon
Judoka at the 1980 Summer Olympics
Judoka at the 1984 Summer Olympics
Place of birth missing (living people)
African Games medalists in judo
Competitors at the 1978 All-Africa Games
African Games bronze medalists for Cameroon
20th-century Cameroonian people